The Vernon massacre was a 1996 mass shooting that occurred in Vernon, British Columbia. At the time of the shooting, it was the deadliest mass shooting in Canada since the École Polytechnique massacre in 1989.

Shooting
On April 5, 1996, at about 10:30 a.m., Mark Vijay Chahal drove to his ex-wife's home, where one of her sisters was preparing for a wedding. Armed with a .40 calibre S&W semi-automatic pistol and a .38 calibre revolver in each hand, he shot his ex-wife's father in front of the house as he washed his car. He then fired at the windows of the house. After walking into the house, he went from room to room, fatally shooting his ex-wife, her mother, her four sisters, her brother, and the husband of one of the sisters. The Eldest sister's mother-in-law and another girl were injured, and two other girls were left unharmed. Six people died immediately, and three more in the hospital. The shooting lasted 3-4 minutes. Two empty 10 round magazines and 28 revolver shell casings were found at the scene. After the shooting, Chahal drove to a motel three kilometers away. At the motel, he wrote a note apologizing to his family for the shooting and writing several numbers of his relatives. At about 11 a.m., he shot himself in a motel. A 12-gauge pump-action shotgun was found in his car.

Perpetrator
Mark Vijay Chahal, 30, divorced his wife in January 1995. His wife had repeatedly complained to the police about domestic violence. He also threatened her family that none of the daughters would marry. Chahal had no criminal record and all weapons were registered to him. Before the shooting, he exchanged his car for a rented van. Because of this, police speculated that he was planning to flee after the shooting.

References

External links
Memorial to the victims of the shooting
Vigil to remember Vernon mass murder

1996 murders in Canada
1996 mass shootings in Canada
Deaths by firearm in British Columbia
Murder–suicides in Canada
Murder in British Columbia
Massacres in Canada
Mass shootings in Canada
Massacres in 1996
1996 in British Columbia